Charles-Amarin Brand (27 June 1920 – 31 March 2013) was a French prelate of the Roman Catholic Church.

Biography
Brand was born in Mulhouse, France, and was ordained a priest on 11 July 1943 from the Archdiocese of Strasbourg. He was appointed auxiliary archbishop of the Diocese of Fréjus-Toulon on 28 December 1971, as well as titular bishop of Uthina, and was ordained bishop on 13 February 1972. Brand was then appointed auxiliary bishop of the Archdiocese of Strasbourg on 18 November 1976. Brand was archbishop of the Archdiocese of Monaco from 30 July 1981 to 16 July 1984, when he was appointed Archbishop of Archdiocese of Strasbourg. He served at Strasbourg until his retirement on 23 October 1997. He died in 2013.

References

External links 
 Diocese of Frejus-Toulon
 Archdiocese of Strasbourg

1920 births
2013 deaths
20th-century Roman Catholic bishops in France
Auxiliary bishops of Strasbourg
Archbishops of Monaco
20th-century Roman Catholic archbishops in France
Archbishops of Strasbourg